Fugitive Valley is a 1941 American Western film directed by S. Roy Luby. The film is the eighth in Monogram Pictures' "Range Busters" series, and it stars Ray "Crash" Corrigan as Crash, John "Dusty" King as Dusty and Max "Alibi" Terhune as Alibi, with Julie Duncan, Glenn Strange and Bob Kortman.

Cast
Ray Corrigan as Crash Corrigan
John 'Dusty' King as Dusty King
Max Terhune as Alibi Terhune
Elmer as Elmer, Alibi's Dummy
Julie Duncan as Ann Savage aka The Whip
Glenn Strange as Gray
Bob Kortman as Red Langdon
Ed Brady as Dr. Steve
Tom London as Marshal Warren
Reed Howes as Jim Brandon
Carl Mathews as Henchman Slick
Edward Peil Sr. as Ed (jailer)
Doye O'Dell as Jim - Whip rider

See also
The Range Busters series:

 The Range Busters (1940)
 Trailing Double Trouble (1940)
 West of Pinto Basin (1940)
 Trail of the Silver Spurs (1941)
 The Kid's Last Ride (1941)
 Tumbledown Ranch in Arizona (1941)
 Wrangler's Roost (1941)
 Fugitive Valley (1941)
 Saddle Mountain Roundup (1941)
 Tonto Basin Outlaws (1941)
 Underground Rustlers (1941)
 Thunder River Feud (1942)
 Rock River Renegades (1942)
 Boot Hill Bandits (1942)
 Texas Trouble Shooters (1942)
 Arizona Stage Coach (1942)
 Texas to Bataan (1942)
 Trail Riders (1942)
 Two Fisted Justice (1943)
 Haunted Ranch (1943)
 Land of Hunted Men (1943)
 Cowboy Commandos (1943)
 Black Market Rustlers (1943)
 Bullets and Saddles (1943)

External links

1941 films
1941 Western (genre) films
Monogram Pictures films
1940s English-language films
American black-and-white films
American Western (genre) films
Films directed by S. Roy Luby
Range Busters
1940s American films